The Stow–Munroe Falls City School District (SMFCSD) is a public primary and secondary school district with administrative offices in Stow, Ohio.  Located in eastern Summit County, the district serves more than 5,100 students and has 6 elementary schools. 2 middle schools. And 1 high school  – primarily from the cities of Stow and Munroe Falls – but also from neighboring portions of Cuyahoga Falls, Franklin Township, Hudson and Tallmadge.  With a staff of more than 600, SMFCSD operates eleven facilities: its own central office, a bus garage, six elementary schools, one intermediate school, one middle school and one high school.  Tom Bratten currently serves as superintendent.

Budget
As of 2015, the Stow–Munroe Falls School District has a budget surplus of over $25 million. The five-year financial forecast beginning in the fiscal year 2015 and ending in the fiscal year 2017 also assumes 2% salary increases for staff each year from 2014 through 2017 as well as 2% increases for other expenditures, although the forecast does not include certain annual revenues as per its conservative revenue assumptions. As of 2013, the total district yearly revenue was over $56,000,000. Salaries and employee benefits accounted for 97.1% of the budget.

Schools

See also
 List of school districts in Ohio
 Ohio Department of Education

References
Notes

External links

School districts in Summit County, Ohio